Aslan Abdusalayevich Dashayev (born 19 February 1989) is a Russian footballer who plays for FC Volga Ulyanovsk.

Career
Dashayev made his professional debut for FC Terek Grozny on 13 July 2010 in the Russian Cup game against FC Luch-Energiya Vladivostok.

He made his Russian Football National League debut for FC Angusht Nazran on 7 July 2013 in a game against FC Neftekhimik Nizhnekamsk.

He played in the 2017–18 Russian Cup final  for FC Avangard Kursk on 9 May 2018 in the Volgograd Arena against 2-1 winners FC Tosno.

Dashayev made his Russian Premier League debut for FC Fakel Voronezh on 17 July 2022 against FC Krasnodar. 

Dashayev's contract with Fakel was terminated by mutual agreement on 31 January 2023. On the same day, Dashayev joined FC Volga Ulyanovsk in the Russian First League.

Career statistics

References

External links
  Player page on the official FC Terek Grozny website
 

1989 births
Sportspeople from Grozny
Living people
Russian footballers
Association football midfielders
FC Akhmat Grozny players
FC Angusht Nazran players
PFC Spartak Nalchik players
FC Avangard Kursk players
FC Fakel Voronezh players
FC Volga Ulyanovsk players
Russian Premier League players
Russian First League players
Russian Second League players